Newsreader can refer to:
 Newsreader (Usenet), a computer program for reading Usenet newsgroups
 Newsreaders, a television series on Adult Swim
 News presenter, a person that presents a news show on television, radio or the Internet
 News aggregator, a computer program for syndicated Web content supplied in the form of a web feed
 The Newsreader, a fictional Australian television series about newsreaders in the 80s